The 2018 O'Byrne Cup was played by county teams of Leinster GAA. It began in December 2017 and ended in May 2018.

On 14 January 2018, the result of the Meath versus Longford semi-final was determined by a free-taking competition, as the score was level at the end of both normal time and extra time. Each side took five free kicks from the forty five metre line and Meath won 2-1. This was the first inter-county Gaelic match to be decided in this way (previously the match would have been replayed).

The final was delayed on multiple occasions due to bad weather; it was finally played in May, with Meath the winners.

Format

There are 11 teams, in three groups of three teams and one group two teams. In the three-team groups, each team plays the other teams once; in the two-team group, the teams play each other in two games. Two group points are awarded for a win and one for a draw.

The four group winners play in the semi-finals and final. If a game is level after the normal seventy minutes, two ten minute periods of extra time are played each way. If the score is still level after extra time, a free-taking competition is held to determine the result.

Group stage

Group 1

Group 2

Group 3

Group 4

Knockout stage

Semi-finals

Final

References

External links

O'Byrne Cup
O'Byrne Cup